Georgiy Stepanovich Zhzhonov (22 March 1915 – 8 December 2005), was a Soviet and Russian stage and film actor and writer. He is known for playing the spy Mikhail Tulyev in the "Resident" quartet of films, Beware of the Car (1966), The Hot Snow (1973), and many others, and was a popular actor. He was appointed People's Artist of the USSR in 1980.

Early life and education 
Zhzhonov's parents grew up in a peasant family from the Tver Region. His mother was his father's second wife, and there were five children in this family. They moved to the city and his father opened his own bakery, but never became wealthy.

Zhzhonov was born on 22 March 1915, and, like many of his peers, finished school in grade seven. He then studied acrobatics at the Leningrad College of Circus and Estrada Arts, and started to give performances with a friend. There he was spotted by film director Eduard Ioganson in 1932, and asked him to play the part a tractor driver in the film Hero's Mistake. After this break, Zhzhonov was accepted by the Leningrad Theatrical School, where he studied under renowned director Sergei Gerasimov, graduating in 1935.

Career

Incarceration
Travelling in a train with Nikolai Kryuchkov and Pyotr Aleynikov on a train, he met an American diplomat, and later he was charged with espionage related to this man he barely knew.

In 1936, Zhzhonov,s brother Boris, a Leningrad University student, was arrested for "anti-Soviet activities and terrorist leanings", during a period of political repression by the government in the wake of the assassination of Sergei Kirov. Their parents and Georgiy were exiled to Kazakhstan; however, Georgiy, instead he headed to the set of Komsomolsk, a film being made by Gerasimov in Komsomolsk-on-Amur.

After the murder of Sergei Kirov in December 1934, Stalin's first Great Purge began. As part of this, after his brother Boris was condemned, the whole family was exiled to Kasakhstan. In 1938, Zhzhonov was arrested on political motives was forced to confess, and sentenced to five years in the gulag at Kolyma. Put to work as a logger and gold miner, he managed to survive, unlike his brother Boris, who died of exhaustion in Vorkuta, and another brother who was executed by firing squad. Just before Victory Day (9 May) in spring 1945, Zhzhonov was released on parole and sent to work at the  Magadan Theatre. Two years later he was fully released, thanks to the efforts of Gerasimov (although banned from living in larger industrial cities), and went to Sverdlovsk. Here he was able to do some film acting when the studios were open.

He was again arrested in 1949 and this time exiled to Norilsk, where he took stage roles with the local drama theatre until 1953. He was finally exonerated at the age of 38 (around 1953).

Return to Leningrad
He returned to Leningrad around 1954, first working at the regional drama theatre, then Lensovet Theatre, until 1962. 

He started taking on cameo roles in films. In 1966 his role as a compassionate traffic warden in Eldar Ryazanov's comedy Beware of the Car was noticed. This was the first of a quartet of films based around the same character.

He also met director Yuly Karasik on the set of The Man I Love at this time, but in the meantime his relationship with Igor Vladimirov, director of Lensovet, deteriorated to the point that Zhzhonov left Leningrad and went to Moscow. There he joined Mossovet Theatre, led by Yuri Zavadsky.

Ironically, Zhzhonov was frequently cast in the roles of policemen and KGB agents. This Gulag victim was even awarded a special KGB prize for the screen versions of three novels by Yulian Semyonov. Zhzhonov was also invited to play Stierlitz, but declined for personal reasons.

In later life, Zhzhonov was a member of the jury at human rights International Human Rights Film Festival "Stalker", which toured the country.

Writing
Zhzhonov loved literature, and wrote short stories when he was a young man, although they were not published. Later, he wrote memoirs of his days in the gulags, as well as a novel, From Capercaillie to the Firebird and a number of stories.

Honours, recognition and awards

He was appointed People's Artist of the USSR in 1980.

His awards include:
 Medal "In Commemoration of the 250th Anniversary of Leningrad"
 Medal "In Commemoration of the 850th Anniversary of Moscow"
 Medal "Veteran of Labour"
 Honored Artist of the RSFSR (1969)
 Vasilyev Brothers State Prize of the RSFSR (1973), for his performance as General Bessonov in movie Hot Snow
 People's Artist of the RSFSR (1979)
 People's Artist of the USSR (1980)
 Order of the Red Banner of Labour (1985)
 Order of Lenin (1991)
 Lifetime Achievement Award, Sozvezdie International Film Festival (1992)
 Crystal Turandot Award (1995)
 Order "For Merit to the Fatherland", 4th class (1995)
 Nika Award (1997)
 Vyborg Walk of Actors Fame (1998)
 Order "For Merit to the Fatherland", 2nd class (2000)
 Monument to him unveiled in Chelyabinsk (2000)
 International Human Rights Film Festival "Stalker" prize named Georgiy Zhzhonov Special Prize

In 2005, Zhzhonov spent his 90th birthday acting in the Russian Army Theatre. Later that day, he was invited to the Kremlin to be invested with the highest civilian decoration of Russia. During a conversation that followed, President Putin admitted that Zhzhonov's roles had prompted him to become an intelligence officer.

Personal life
Zhzhonov had an elder brother, Boris. He married three times, with each marriage producing a daughter.

He died of lung cancer on 8 December 2005, and was buried in Novodevichy Cemetery in Moscow.

Filmography 

1931: Road to Life
1932: Hero Error as Pavel Vetrov
1934: Chapaev as Teryoshka (uncredited)
1934: Crown Prince of the Republic as Bachelor-architect
1938: Komsomolsk as Mavrin
1949: Alitet Goes to the Mountains
1955: Other People's Relatives as guest on the wedding (uncredited)
1957: The Storm as Gavriil
1957: On the island of Far as Klepikov
1958: My dear man as Ustimenko
1958: The Night Guest  as Sergey Petrovich, artist
1959: Corrected Believe as Braitsev
1960: Baltic Skies as driver
1961: A man Does not Give Up as Maslyukov
1961: He took the Train Driver as Ivan Chereda 
1962: The Day You Get 30 Years Old as hospital patient
1962: Planeta Bur as Roman Bobrov
1963: Posledniy khleb as Militsia Major
1963: Malenkiye mechtateli as Fyodor
1963: Tretya raketa as Zheltykh
1963: Silence as Gnezdilov
1964: The Big Ore as surgeon
1965: The Hockey Players as Coach Sperantov
1965: Poka front v oborone as Sergey Nikolayevich
1965: Beloved as Ivan Yegorovich (voice)
1965: End of Squadron as Rayevsky
1965: O chyom molchala tayga as Grigoriy Anikin
1966: The Man I Love as Muromtsev
1966: Gibel eskadry
1966: Beware of the Car as Militsiya officer 
1966: Idu iskat as Andrey Gusarov
1967: Chelovek, kotorogo ya lyublyu as Muromtsev
1967: Stewardess (TV Short) as passenger-screenwriter
1967: The Way To Saturn as Timerin
1967: Now You Judge as Arkadi Iskra
1967: Spring on the Oder as Petrovich 'Ryzheusyy'
1968: Doktor Vera as Sukhohlebov
1968: The Final Of Saturn as Timerin
1969: A Little Crane as Father Leonid
1969: Dawn Dates as Alexey Dmitrievich Vorobiev
1970: Ostrov Volchiy as Pavel Ilyich Tagilov
1970: Secret Agent's Destiny (Resident's Way) as Mikhail Tulyev
1971: Nechayannaya lyubov as Matvey Kontsevoy
1972: The End of the Lyubavins as Yemelyan Lyubavin
1971: All The King's Men (TV Mini-Series) as Stark
1972: Battle after the Victory as Timerin 
1972: The Hot Snow as Bessonov
1972: Tracer Element as Nikita Alekseevich Dubrovin, KGB's Colonel
1973: Mechenyy atom as Nikita Dubrovin
1974: Tayna zabytoy perepravy as Kozyrev
1974: The Ocean as Maxim Ilyich Chasovnikov
1974: Ishchu moyu sudbu
1974: Looking for My Destiny as Vladimir Karjakin, teacher
1975: You will find in Battle (TV Movie) as Valentin Savvich Zbandut
1975: Choosing Target as Vitaliy Zubavin
1976: Takaya ona, igra as Viktor Basov
1977: Poseidon Comes to Rescue as Chigrinov
1978: The Cure Against Fear as general Sharapov
1980: Air Crew as Andrei Timchenko, Captain
1982: Krepysh as Shaposhnikov
1982: Resident Return (Resident Is Back) as Mikhail Tulyev
1984: Gate to Heaven as Colonel Ivan Lebedenko
1985: The City of Brides as Andrei Dmitrievich Prokhorov
1986:  as Mikhail Tulyev
1986: The Time of Sons as Sergey Vasilevich Uzelkov
1987: The End of Eternity as Laban Twissel 
1987: Ivan Veliky
1988: Enclosure as Menshikov, Ambassador of the USSR
1999: Viewless Traveller as Willie, Life Guards Medic (final film role)

Notes

References

External links

1915 births
2005 deaths
20th-century Russian male actors
20th-century Russian male writers
21st-century Russian male actors
21st-century Russian male writers
Male actors from Saint Petersburg
Writers from Saint Petersburg
Honored Artists of the RSFSR
People's Artists of the RSFSR
People's Artists of the USSR
Recipients of the Nika Award
Recipients of the Order "For Merit to the Fatherland", 2nd class
Recipients of the Order "For Merit to the Fatherland", 4th class
Recipients of the Order of Lenin
Recipients of the Order of the Red Banner of Labour
Recipients of the Vasilyev Brothers State Prize of the RSFSR
Gulag detainees
Soviet rehabilitations
Russian male child actors
Russian male film actors
Russian male stage actors
Russian male television actors
Russian male voice actors
Russian memoirists
Soviet male child actors
Soviet male film actors
Soviet male stage actors
Soviet male television actors
Soviet male voice actors
Soviet memoirists
Deaths from lung cancer in Russia
Burials at Novodevichy Cemetery